Kholmy is an urban-type settlement in Koriukivka Raion, Chernihiv Oblast, Ukraine. It hosts the administration of Kholmy settlement hromada, one of the hromadas of Ukraine. Population: 

Kholmy produces alcohol, bricks, dairy products, timber, and has a museum.

History

Cossack era 
The town was founded in the middle of the 16th century. On the eve of the liberation war of Ukrainian people led by Bohdan Khmelnytsky he belonged Caspar Borkowski - "Lithuanian Commissioner and storekeepers' killed by rebels in 1648. After the reunification of Ukraine, the village was a part of Ponornytskoyi with hundreds Chernigov Regiment soldiers. For the versatile Hetman Ivan Samoilovych, 1672, it was reserved for a military friend, then Colonel VK Borkowski, whose descendants owned the Hill for 30 years after the 19th century.

Farmers engaged in agriculture. But the sandy soils were marginal, because the main source of their livelihood was crafts. The commonwealth made wheels, wagons, sleds, different wooden utensils and sold them in Ponornytsi, carp and Voronezh. In 1674 the Ubed river near the village was dammed and there built a mill and built a smithy for producing iron in the late 17th century. Later was founded a distillery. This was a peasant and Cossack economy. But over time, the Cossacks turned into serfs. So, in 1746 there still lived 96 Cossacks, at the end of the 18th century.

Geography and Climate
The Chernihiv-Holm-Semenivka highway passes through the village.

References

External links

Sosnitsky Uyezd
Urban-type settlements in Koriukivka Raion